Werner Husemann (10 November 1919 – 2 February 2014) was a German Luftwaffe night fighter ace and recipient of the Knight's Cross of the Iron Cross, the highest award in the military and paramilitary forces of Nazi Germany during World War II. Husemann claimed to have shot down 34 enemy aircraft, and was credited with 30 aerial victories.

Career
Husemann was born on 10 November 1919 in Schötmar/Lippe. He enlisted in the Luftwaffe in 1941 and served with a weather reconnaissance squadron.

Night fighter career

Following the 1939 aerial Battle of the Heligoland Bight, RAF attacks shifted to the cover of darkness, initiating the Defence of the Reich campaign. By mid-1940, Generalmajor (Brigadier General) Josef Kammhuber had established a night air defense system dubbed the Kammhuber Line. It consisted of a series of control sectors equipped with radars and searchlights and an associated night fighter. Each sector named a Himmelbett (canopy bed) would direct the night fighter into visual range with target bombers. In 1941, the Luftwaffe started equipping night fighters with airborne radar such as the Lichtenstein radar. This airborne radar did not come into general use until early 1942.

In late 1942, Husemann transferred to the Stab (staff) of Nachtjagdgeschwader 1 (the 1st Night Fighter Wing). He claimed his first aerial victorie on the night of 17/18 August 1942. His victories increased to 17 by the end of 1943, including three British Avro Lancaster bombers shot down on the night of 25/26 June 1943. He was appointed Staffelkapitän (squadron commander) of the 7th squadron of NJG 1 on 1 October 1943. Husemann was awarded the German Cross in Gold on 24 October 1943, and the Ehrenpokal der Luftwaffe on 1 November 1943.

Group commander
On 4 January 1944, Husemann became commander of the I. Gruppe of Nachtjagdgeschwader 3 (NJG 3—3rd Night Fighter Wing), succeeding Hauptmann Paul Szameitat. Husemann was awarded the Knight's Cross of the Iron Cross on 30 September 1944 after being credited with 30 aerial victories. By the war's end he had 34 aerial victories in over 250 night combat missions. His last 13 victories were claimed with Oberfeldwebel Hans-Georg Schierholz as his wireless/radio operator.

On 14 November 1944, Husemann, flying a Junkers Ju 88 G6 attacked a Short Stirling bomber near Ringkøbing. During the attack, the Ju 88 was hit by the defensive fire of the Stirling's tail gunner.

Summary of career

Aerial victory claims
According to Spick, Husemann was credited with 32 aerial victories claimed in over 250 combat missions. The authors Heaton and Lewis state that he was credited with 34 aerial victories. Obermaier lists him with 30 nocturnal aerial victories claimed in over 250 combat missions. Foreman, Parry and Mathews, authors of Luftwaffe Night Fighter Claims 1939 – 1945, researched the German Federal Archives and found records for 32 nocturnal victory claims Mathews and Foreman also published Luftwaffe Aces — Biographies and Victory Claims, listing Husemann with 31 claims.

In some instances, aerial victories were claimed and logged in a Planquadrat (PQ—grid reference).

Awards
 Iron Cross (1939) 2nd and 1st Class
 Honour Goblet of the Luftwaffe (Ehrenpokal der Luftwaffe) on 1 November 1943 as Oberleutnant and pilot
 German Cross in Gold on 24 October 1943 as Oberleutnant in the 7./Nachtjagdgeschwader 1
 Knight's Cross of the Iron Cross on 30 September 1944 as Major and Gruppenkommandeur of I./Nachtjagdgeschwader 3

Notes

References

Citations

Bibliography

 
 
 
 
 
 
 
 
 
 
 
 
 
 
 
 
 
 
 
 
 
 
 
 
 
 
 
 
 
 
 

1919 births
2014 deaths
People from Bad Salzuflen
Luftwaffe pilots
German World War II flying aces
People from Lippe
Recipients of the Gold German Cross
Recipients of the Knight's Cross of the Iron Cross
Military personnel from North Rhine-Westphalia